Elections to Hyndburn Borough Council were held on 22 May 2014. One third of the council was up for election and the Labour party stayed in overall control of the council.

The total registered electorate across Hyndburn comes to 43,404 potential voters.  In this May 2014 election 16,766 turned out to vote - 38.63%.

There was also the European Election being held on the same day and voter turnout, across ALL voters in every Hyndburn-Ward, was much higher than usual.

Background
Before the election Labour had a majority of 23 councillors, Conservatives had 9 councillors, while Independent (politician) had 3 councillors.

Labour and UKIP candidates contested for every ward, Conservative candidates contested all except Milnshaw-ward & Peel-Ward, only four Independent candidates contested in the Clayton-le-Moors-ward, Netherton-ward, Peel-ward & Rishton-ward and just three Green candidates contested for Huncoat-ward, Overton-Ward & Peel-ward.

Local Election result
The majority grouping of councillors was as the headline result of the election, with Labour's majority unchanged, Independent and Conservative councillors having lost one seat each overall, and UKIP gaining two new seats:

After the election, the composition of the council was -

Labour 23
Conservative 8
Independent 2
UKIP 2

Reference: 2010 Hyndburn Borough Council election#Local Election result

NB: Five (of the 16) Council ward seats that were NOT up for re-election in 2014 included the following wards - Altham, Baxenden and Church, plus Barnfield and Central in Accrington.  Although voters across those same Five wards, were also still able to vote in the European Election.

Ward results

Clayton-le-Moors

Huncoat

Immanuel

Milnshaw

Netherton

Overton

Peel

Rishton

Spring Hill

St. Andrew's

St. Oswald's

References

2014 Hyndburn election result
Ward results
Persons Nominated in each Ward

2014 English local elections
2014
2010s in Lancashire